Predator 2 is a 1992 second video game adaptation of the film of the same title, developed by Teeny Weeny Games and Krisalis Software and published by Acclaim Entertainment. It was released for the Sega Genesis, Game Gear, and Master System.

Reception

Diehard GameFan gave the Genesis version of Predator 2 a score of 72%, comparing it to Smash TV with the freedom to move around, but "overall found it to be a little too average from beginning to end."

German magazine Play Time gave it a positive review and a score of 77%, but the Game Gear version received a low score of 41% from German magazine Mega Fun.  Mega gave the game a negative score of 28%.

References

External links

1992 video games
Action video games
Predator (franchise) games
Master System games
Game Gear games
Sega Genesis games
Single-player video games
Video games about police officers
Video games developed in the United Kingdom
Video games featuring black protagonists
Video games scored by Matt Furniss
Video games set in 1997
Video games set in Los Angeles
Video games with isometric graphics
Krisalis Software games
Acclaim Entertainment games